Karen Inge Halkier (30 May 1937 – 15 August 2005) was a Danish athlete. She competed in the women's discus throw at the 1960 Summer Olympics.

References

1937 births
2005 deaths
Athletes (track and field) at the 1960 Summer Olympics
Danish female discus throwers
Olympic athletes of Denmark
Place of birth missing